Edwin Díaz may refer to:
 Edwin Díaz (born 1994), Puerto Rican professional baseball pitcher
 Edwin Díaz (second baseman) (born 1975), Puerto Rican professional baseball infielder